Esta página da Wikipedia não é oficial e não tem qualquer relação com a instituição - é apenas uma página feita por fãs.

The Colégio Vértice (lit. Vertex School) is an elementary and high school in the city of São Paulo, Brazil, founded in 1976, and attended by approximately 1000 students. In 2009, it achieved the best placement in the Brazilian High School National Exam, ENEM.

History 
In 1976, Walquiria founded, in Campo Belo neighborhood, the Curumim kindergarten school, in honor of Brazilian historical roots. As a pioneer in education, Walquiria created a unique method of literacy. In the 80's and 90's the school expanded its horizons with elementary (1981) and high school (1988) classes, now with the name of Colégio Vértice.

Grades 
Vértice is a small/middle size school, with mandatory uniform and a maximum of four classes per grade with an average of 30 students in each. The students are evaluated based on two criteria: quantitative and qualitative. Quantitative is divided in VAs, short tests to check if the student understood the contents given in the last weeks, and PBs, typical bimestral exams. Qualitative measures, generally speaking, the student's participation.

The final grade is calculated the following way: 0,15 VAs + 0,35 PBs + 0,50 Qualitative

ENEM Por Escola: the turning point 
Until the late 2000s, Vértice was a very small school, with less than 20 students in each year. But it all changed when INEP decided to publish the ENEM Por Escola ranking, showing that the Campo Belo school had excellent results and was one of the best education systems of Brazil. Since then, the demand for admission in Vértice has grown exponentially, and now the school has 50-100 students in each year and established itself as one of the four greatest schools of São Paulo, alongside Bandeirantes, Mobile and Santa Cruz, in the so-called G4.

Even though Vértice is not as old nor traditional as the other three schools, its results in ENEM Por Escola are significantly better, as shown in the table below:

Vestibulares and the Class of 2020 

 USP: Vértice usually has 20-30 students approved at USP, the majority of them at Faculdade de Direito da Universidade de São Paulo, Escola Politécnica da Universidade de São Paulo, Faculdade de Economia e Administração e Contabilidade da Universidade de São Paulo.

External links
 Official website
Team Orion https://www.instagram.com/_team_orion
Copa Diggio http://copadiggio.com.br/
OBMEP http://www.obmep.org.br/

Educational institutions established in 1976
Private schools in Brazil
1976 establishments in Brazil